Mansour Seck is a Senegalese singer and musician born in Podor, in the north of the country. Best known for his collaboration with lifelong friend Baaba Maal, he has also toured and released several solo albums. He is blind.

Biography
Seck was born into the griot caste, traditionally of low status and associated with singing, story telling and playing musical instruments. From childhood, Seck has been a close friend of Baaba Maal, and in 1977 the two musicians travelled to explore the musical traditions of Mauritania and Mali.

Maal went to study Music in Dakar, and in 1982, he received a scholarship to study at the École des Beaux-Arts in Paris. Once established there Maal invited Seck and two other musicians to join him. They formed a band which became known as Dande Lenol (The People's Voice) and played mainly to the Senegalese immigrant communities of Paris. Seck was the band's primary guitarist. The album "Djaam Leeli" (1984) is from this early time together. As their confidence grew, they toured in the US together with Seck's first solo release coming in 1994.

Mansour Seck played alongside Baaba Maal as part of Dande Lenol at the WOMAD Festival at Charlton Park on 29 July 2007.

Music

Discography
1984 – Djam Leelii (with Baaba Maal) – Mango Records
1991 – Baayo (with Baaba Maal) – Mango Records
1994 – N'Der Fouta Tooro, Volume 1 – Stern's Africa
1995 – N'Der Fouta Tooro, Volume 2 – Stern's Africa
1995 – The Rough Guide to West African Music – World Music Network
1997 – Yelayo – Stern's Africa
1999 – Unwired: Acoustic Music from Around the World – World Music Network
2013 – The Rough Guide to the Music of Senegal – World Music Network

References

The Leopard Man's African Music Guide
calabashmusic.com
Biography of Baaba Maal at RFI

External links
Review of concert-Baaba Maal & Mansour Seck, 2002
Seck and Maal being received into Afropop's 'Hall of Fame'

Senegalese guitarists
Living people
21st-century Senegalese male singers
Year of birth missing (living people)
20th-century Senegalese male singers